The Vancouver Writers Fest is a non-profit organization that produces a variety of literary events in Vancouver, British Columbia, Canada. Its main event is the Vancouver Writers Fest, which is an annual week-long literary festival held on Granville Island, Vancouver in late October. Writers from Canada and abroad attend the festival to perform readings, interviews and panel discussions. The organization also runs the Incite reading series in the spring and the Spreading the Word schools program year-round.

The Festival was introduced in 1988 by founding Artistic Director Alma Lee. In 2010, the Festival was named the "Best Large Literary Festival in Canada" by the Canadian Tourism Commission. The Vancouver Writers Fest adopted its current name in 2012.

Past authors have included Martin Amis, Margaret Atwood, Maeve Binchy, Peter Carey, Roddy Doyle, Timothy Findley, John Irving, P. D. James, Thomas Keneally, Andrea Levy, Frank McCourt, Rohinton Mistry, David Mitchell, Alice Munro, Michael Ondaatje, J. K. Rowling, Salman Rushdie and Carol Shields.

Programming 
The programming of the Vancouver Writers Fest aims to promote literacy on both a local and international level; to support and encourage British Columbia and Canadian writers in their vocation; to showcase a variety of international works of literature; and to educate a wide range of communities and age groups in literacy and the written arts.

The main regular events produced by the Vancouver Writers Fest include: The Incite Reading Series, the Writers Fest on Granville Island and the Youth Education Programs. The festival's executive director is Kaile Shilling and its artistic director is Leslie Hurtig.

Incite 

Incite is a free, bi-monthly public series that runs from January to May. Incite is put on in partnership with the Vancouver Public Library and features discussions, panels and interviews with multiple authors. Past authors who have participated include Yann Martel, Bernard Schlink, Joyce Carol Oates and William Gibson. The Incite reading series takes place in Downtown Vancouver at the Alice McKay room of the Vancouver Public Library Central Branch.

Vancouver Writers Fest on Granville Island 
Festival events include interviews, panel discussions, performances and readings as well as a four days event for kindergarten to grade 12 students. Recurring events include Grand Openings, The Literary Cabaret, the Sunday Brunch and the Afternoon Tea.

Youth Education Programs 
The Vancouver Writers Fest’s youth education programs are an integral part of the programming of the organization.

Some of the education events include:
 36 sessions aimed at children and youth during the October Festival
 Writers in the Classroom: free author visits to schools in Metro Vancouver
 Youth Writing Contest for grades 8 to 12

The Youth Education Programs reach over 6,000 students during the Festival and 1,000 during its year-round programming.

Literary Prize Winners who have appeared at the Vancouver Writers Fest

Canadian Awards

Scotiabank Giller Prize

Governor General's Literary Award for English Fiction

Charles Taylor Prize for Literary Non-Fiction

Rogers Writers' Trust Fiction Prize

International Awards

Man Booker Prize

Pulitzer Prize for Fiction

International IMPAC Dublin Literary Award

Bailey’s Women’s Prize for Fiction (Orange Prize)

Granville Island 
The Vancouver Writers Fest is based in Granville Island, a venue that adds to the overall experience of the October festival.

Some of the venues of the October Festival in Granville Island include:
 Performance Works
 Granville Island Stage
 Waterfront Theatre
 Improv Centre
 Studio 1398
 Stanley Industrial Alliance Stage
Some of the off site venues include:
 St. Andrew’s-Wesley United Church
 The Vancouver Playhouse
 The Beaumont Studio Artist Society

References

External links 

National Post: Vancouver Writers Fest Had A lot To Offer

Professional associations based in British Columbia
Non-profit organizations based in Vancouver
Festivals in Vancouver
Literary festivals in British Columbia
1988 establishments in British Columbia
Canadian writers' organizations